Jackson 5 Christmas Album is the first  Christmas album, and fourth studio album, by Motown family quintet the Jackson 5, released on October 15, 1970. Included on the Christmas Album is the Jacksons' hit single version of "Santa Claus Is Coming to Town". The Jacksons' versions of "I Saw Mommy Kissing Santa Claus" and "Santa Claus Is Coming to Town" remain frequent radio requests during the Christmas season. The album spent four weeks at the number one position on Billboard magazine's special Christmas Albums chart that the magazine published in December 1970, making it the best-selling Christmas album of that year and also of the year 1972 in the United States. This album was a top seller and had the potential to chart high on the US Billboard Top LPs ranking, but from 1963 to 1973, holiday albums were not allowed to chart in it. The album has been praised by music critics.

In the US, the album was released on CD in 1986. In 2003, Universal Motown re-released the album as part of their 20th Century Masters - The Christmas Collection series. This version of the album was remastered and included the Michael Jackson solo song "Little Christmas Tree" as a bonus track (from the various artists compilation A Motown Christmas, originally released in 1973). In 2009, the album was once again re-released as Ultimate Christmas Collection, with Christmas greetings from four of the band members, remixes, and a medley of songs from the album.

Release
The release of Jackson 5 Christmas Album in October 1970 marked the end of a successful year for the band. Three albums were released by the group, with ABC in May and Third Album in September, with a tour running from May to December. The group recreated a similar feat the following year, with Maybe Tomorrow hitting record stores in April, the Goin' Back to Indiana soundtrack in September, and a greatest hits collection in December, with a tour which ran from January to August. In addition, Michael Jackson's solo debut single "Got to Be There", also hit the music stands in October, with the complete album of the same name coming out in January 1972.

Reception
 
Jackson 5 Christmas Album has been hailed by many as one of the best holiday albums. AllMusic's Lindsay Planer rated Jackson 5 Christmas Album four and a half out of five stars. She stated that "they carefully crafted and significantly modernized familiar seasonal selections." She also praised all of the tracks. Joshua Alston of The A.V. Club also praised the album and said "the original songs are among its finest moments". He also said "Jackson 5 Christmas is tough to compete with because it isn't—as Christmas records so often are—an inessential brand extension or bait for discography completists. It's a potent distillation of the spirit of Christmas, an album joyful enough to make me feel like it's the most wonderful time of the year rather than merely telling me so." Rolling Stone also praised the album, calling it a "gem".

Track listing

Source:

Personnel
Production
 Hal Davis – producer
 The Corporation - producers
 James Anthony Carmichael, Gene Page – arrangements

Technical
 Adam Abrams – production coordinator
 Harry Weinger – supervisor
 Vartan – art direction
 Alana Coghlan, Katherine Marking – design

Charts

References

1970 Christmas albums
Christmas albums by American artists
The Jackson 5 albums
Motown albums
Albums arranged by Gene Page
Albums produced by Berry Gordy
Albums produced by Alphonzo Mizell
Albums produced by Deke Richards
Albums produced by Freddie Perren
Albums produced by the Corporation (record production team)
Pop Christmas albums
Rhythm and blues Christmas albums